Edward Simon may refer to:

Edward Simon (musician) (born 1969), Venezuelan jazz pianist and composer
Edward Simon (choreographer), American ballroom dance champion and choreographer
Florent Edouard Simon (1799–1866), Louisiana Supreme Court justice